Valentin Aleksandrovich Nikolayev (August 16, 1921 in Yerosovo, Vladimir Governorate – October 9, 2009 in Moscow) was a Soviet football player and coach.

Honours
 Soviet Top League winner: 1946, 1947, 1948, 1950, 1951, 1970 (as manager).
 Soviet Top League runner-up: 1945, 1949.
 Soviet Top League bronze: 1964, 1965 (both as manager).
 Soviet Cup winner: 1945, 1948, 1951.
 Soviet Top League top scorer: 1946 (16 goals), 1947 (14 goals).
 Grigory Fedotov Club member: 111 goals.
 As a manager: Europe U-23 champion: 1976, Europe U-21 champion: 1980.

International career
Nikolayev made his debut for USSR on July 20, 1952 in an Olympics game against Bulgaria. As a manager, he was in charge of USSR national football team from October 1970 until the end of 1971.

References

External links
 Profile 

1921 births
2009 deaths
People from Sobinsky District
People from Vladimirsky Uyezd
Soviet footballers
Soviet Union international footballers
Soviet football managers
Russian footballers
Soviet Top League players
PFC CSKA Moscow players
Olympic footballers of the Soviet Union
Footballers at the 1952 Summer Olympics
Soviet Union national football team managers
PFC CSKA Moscow managers
Soviet Union under-21 international footballers
Association football forwards
Sportspeople from Vladimir Oblast